In enzymology, a lysine carbamoyltransferase is an enzyme that catalyzes the chemical reaction

carbamoyl phosphate + L-lysine  phosphate + L-homocitrulline

Thus, the two substrates of this enzyme are carbamoyl phosphate and L-lysine, whereas its two products are phosphate and L-homocitrulline.

This enzyme belongs to the family of transferases that transfer one-carbon groups, specifically the carboxy- and carbamoyltransferases. The systematic name of this enzyme class is carbamoyl-phosphate:L-lysine carbamoyltransferase. This enzyme is also called lysine transcarbamylase.

References

 

EC 2.1.3
Enzymes of unknown structure